The name Simon has been used for three tropical cyclones in the Eastern Pacific Ocean and for one in the Australian region.

In the Eastern Pacific:
 Tropical Storm Simon (1984) – churned in the open ocean.
 Tropical Storm Simon (1990) – did not affect land.
 Hurricane Simon (2014) – a Category 4 hurricane that made landfall on the Baja California Peninsula as a remnant low.

In the Australian region:
 Cyclone Simon (1980) – a Category 3 tropical cyclone that struck Queensland.

Pacific hurricane set index articles
Australian region cyclone set index articles